
Gmina Alwernia is an urban-rural gmina (administrative district) in Chrzanów County, Lesser Poland Voivodeship, in southern Poland.

The gmina contains part of the protected area called Tenczynek Landscape Park.

Villages
Apart from the town of Alwernia, Gmina Alwernia contains the villages and settlements of Brodła, Grojec, Kwaczała, Mirów, Nieporaz, Okleśna, Podłęże, Poręba Żegoty, Regulice and Źródła.

Neighbouring gminas
Gmina Alwernia is bordered by the gminas of Babice, Chrzanów, Czernichów, Krzeszowice, Spytkowice, Trzebinia and Zator.

References
Polish official population figures 2006

Alwernia
Chrzanów County